Retinia immanitana is a species of moth of the family Tortricidae. It is found in China (Tianjin, Shandong) and Russia.

The larvae feed on Pinus koraiensis.

References

Moths described in 1969
Eucosmini